Marjorie Eyre-Parker (1897 – 3 December 1987) was an English singer and actress, best known for her performances in the soprano and mezzo-soprano roles of the Savoy Operas. She performed with the D'Oyly Carte Opera Company for more than two decades and later performed with the J. C. Williamson Gilbert and Sullivan Opera Company. She married another D'Oyly Carte performer, Leslie Rands, in 1926.

Life and career
Marjorie Eyre-Parker was born in Derby, England and studied at the Royal College of Music.

D'Oyly Carte years

She joined the D'Oyly Carte Opera Company as a chorister in 1924, also appearing in the small part of Giulia in The Gondoliers. In 1925, she took over her first major role, Yum-Yum in The Mikado, and two more small ones, Lady Ella in Patience and Celia (and also Phyllis, briefly) in Iolanthe. In 1926, she took over the title role in Patience, Rose Maybud in Ruddigore and Gianetta The Gondoliers. In 1928, Eyre continued playing these principal soprano roles (sometimes sharing them), but after the 1928–29 North American tour, Rupert D'Oyly Carte decided to assign mezzo-soprano roles to her.

In 1929, Eyre studied with a voice teacher to lower her range to prepare for her new assignments and became the company's principal soubrette, playing Cousin Hebe in H.M.S. Pinafore, Edith in The Pirates of Penzance, Saphir in Patience, the title role in Iolanthe, Pitti-Sing in The Mikado, Mad Margaret in Ruddigore, and Tessa in The Gondoliers. She gave up the latter four roles from October 1929 to May 1930, when the popular Nellie Briercliffe rejoined the company for the London season, but Eyre added Constance in The Sorcerer at the same time.

In 1930, Eyre resumed all her principal soubrette roles, except switching to Lady Angela in Patience and adding Melissa in Princess Ida and Phoebe Meryll in The Yeomen of the Guard. She played these roles for the next 15 seasons, until she left the D'Oyly Carte Opera Company in 1946.

Later years
In 1949, Rands and Eyre joined fellow senior Savoyards Richard Walker, Helen Roberts, John Dean and Anna Bethell in Australia, where they were engaged by Frank Tait for a Gilbert and Sullivan tour of Australia and New Zealand with the J. C. Williamson Gilbert and Sullivan Opera Company. In 1952, Rands and Eyre played the Earl of Essex and Jill-All-Alone in a week's run of Merrie England for charity in Priory Park, Chichester.

Eyre maintained her interest in Gilbert and Sullivan throughout her life. At the time of her death, at the age of 90, she was a Vice-President of the Gilbert & Sullivan Society in London.

Eyre died in Brighton.

Recordings
Her recordings with D'Oyly Carte included only Lady Saphir in Patience (1930) and Pitti-Sing in The Mikado (1936).

See also
J. C. Williamson

References
 Introduction by Martyn Green.

External links
Marjorie Eyre at Who Was Who in the D'Oyly Carte
Profile of Eyre
Photos of Eyre in Iolanthe
Information about D'Oyly Carte members who performed with the J. C. Williamson company

English mezzo-sopranos
1897 births
1987 deaths
Alumni of the Royal College of Music
20th-century British women opera singers
People from Derby